Sailor Moon Eternal is a 2021 Japanese two-part animated action fantasy film based on the Dream arc of the Sailor Moon manga by Naoko Takeuchi, that serves as a direct continuation and a "fourth season" for the Sailor Moon Crystal anime series. The two-part film is directed by Chiaki Kon, written by Kazuyuki Fudeyasu, chief supervised by Naoko Takeuchi, and co-produced by Toei Animation and Studio Deen. The two-part film was released in Japan in 2021, with the first film on January 8, and the second film on February 11.

The two-part film is the first in the franchise to screen in Japanese theaters in 26 years, the last one having been Sailor Moon SuperS: The Movie, released in 1995.

Netflix acquired streaming rights to both films, and they premiered on June 3, 2021, on the streaming service. A sequel two-part film, Sailor Moon Cosmos, is set to release in Japan on June 9 and 30, 2023.

Plot

Part One
Six months after the Mugen Academy incident, Usagi Tsukino and Chibiusa receive a vision from a pegasus named Helios asking for their help, and Mamoru gets a stabbing feeling in his chest. The Dead Moon Circus arrives on a flagship and its members conjure a dark barrier around the area where the circus tent is. That night, Chibiusa dreams of riding Pegasus, who tells her that he needs the Golden Crystal to save his home realm of Elysion. When Chibiusa tries to return to the 30th century with Diana, the dark barrier stops her and alerts the Amazoness Quartet, prompting them to send a tiger to investigate. Usagi and Chibiusa's brooches are upgraded, allowing them to transform into Super Sailor Moon and Super Sailor Chibi Moon. The Amazoness send some Lemures to fight the Super Sailor Guardians, but they quickly destroy them.

The circus' ringleader Zirconia is instructed by her master, Queen Nehelenia, to let the Super Sailor Guardians' nightmares take hold of them so she can obtain the Silver Crystal. PallaPalla sends the Amazon Trio members Fish Eye, Tiger's Eye, and Hawk's Eye to trap Ami Mizuno, Rei Hino, and Makoto Kino in their respective nightmares, one Guardian at a time. However, the girls are able to break free of them and transform with their respective Sailor Crystals into their Super forms, enabling them to destroy the Amazon Trio. Helios reveals that Mamoru's incessant chest pain are caused by Nehelenia's curse on Elysion, a sacred place within Earth, which also caused Helios to turn into a pegasus, imprisoning him in a cage from which he is astral projecting. Sailor Moon promises that she'll heal Mamoru and hugs him which then gives Usagi the same curse as Mamoru.

Minako Aino is unable to transform, and the Amazoness VesVes sends two knife-throwing twins, Xenotime and Zeolite, after her. In the ensuing conflict, VesVes sends her falling to her death, but she is saved by Artemis, who is about to be crushed with a boulder by PallaPalla but he turns human and gives Minako her crystal, enabling her to transform into Super Sailor Venus and destroy Xenotime and Zeolite. PallaPalla then traps the four Sailor Guardians in vines. Usagi then falls ill from a black rose inside her as well, and Zirconia brings darkness to Earth with the nightmare energy she has accumulated.

Part Two

The spirit of Sailor Saturn talks to young Hotaru Tomoe, and restores her memories of her previous life. Hotaru then gives Haruka Tenoh, Michiru Kaioh, and Setsuna Meioh their crystals, allowing them to transform into Super Sailors Uranus, Neptune, Pluto, and Saturn, they also manage to release Sailors Mercury, Mars, Jupiter, and Venus from PallaPalla's vines. Sailor Chibi Moon, Sailor Moon, and Tuxedo Mask arrive to help, but Sailor Moon and Tuxedo Mask are mortally wounded by Zirconia. Helios teleports Usagi and Mamoru to Elysion to save their lives with what purification power it has left. Sailor Chibi Moon and Sailor Saturn confront the Amazoness Quartet inside a tent, and Saturn reveals the Amazoness Quartet were corrupted by Nehelenia's nightmare power. As the Amazoness Quartet start to come to their senses, Zirconia imprisons them inside orbs, and traps Chibi Moon and Saturn inside shards of glass, before putting all six inside Queen Nehelenia's mirror.

In Elysion, Helios explains to Usagi and Mamoru that the Golden Kingdom used to exist in Elysion, and the Golden Crystal is Earth and Elysion's counterpart to the Silver Millennium's Silver Crystal. Usagi then realizes the Golden Crystal is inside Mamoru, just as the Silver Crystal was sealed inside her. After Helios sends Usagi and Mamoru back to the surface, Zirconia casts a hot, suffocating fog around Jūban which incapacitates them. Helios uses the last of his power to send Elysion's purifying crystals to Earth, blocking Zirconia's fog, and heals the group, but apparently dying as a result. Zirconia attacks Sailor Moon and Tuxedo Mask, and spreads hellish nightmares, but Tuxedo Mask manages to break free and others from the nightmares and the Sailor Guardians use their combined powers to blast and weaken Zirconia who then escapes into Queen Nehelenia's mirror and Sailor Moon follows her inside. She then frees Sailor Chibi Moon and Sailor Saturn, with the latter taking the four orbs containing the Amazoness Quartet with her while the others break the mirror and frees them all, but Nehelenia disappears and Zirconia remains inside the mirror.

The Dead Moon Circus disappears, but the darkness remains throughout the city. The Sailor Guardians and Tuxedo Mask teleport to Elysion, where Queen Nehelenia appears inside her mirror and reflects Super Sailor Moon's attack back at her and everyone, sending them all into a flashback of Queen Nehelenia's past: Queen Nehelenia had arrived uninvited at the party celebrating the birth of Princess Serenity. After their exchange was escalated, Queen Nehelenia was permanently sealed inside her mirror by Queen Serenity, but not before cursing the newborn princess and the Silver Millennium to their inevitable downfall.

Queen Nehelenia takes the Silver Crystal from Super Sailor Moon, but before she can kill the Super Sailor Guardians and take over Earth, Usagi and Tuxedo Mask kiss, breaking free of Queen Nehelenia's nightmare and getting the Silver Crystal back. Super Sailor Moon transforms the other Sailor Guardians into their princess forms and summons Luna, Artemis, and Diana in human form. The other Eternal Sailor Guardians and Tuxedo Mask, using his Golden Crystal, send power to Sailor Moon, transforming her into Eternal Sailor Moon, who destroys Queen Nehelenia and her mirror, restoring Earth and Elysion to normal. Eternal Sailor Chibi Moon revives Helios with the power her Pink Moon Crystal, causing him to realize she was the maiden in his vision. The Amazoness Quartet, who are revealed to be Sailor Guardians of the asteroids named Sailors Ceres, Pallas, Juno, Vesta, who were asleep in the Amazon Jungle until Queen Nehelenia forced them to awaken into a nightmare. They return to their slumber, only to reawaken when Sailor Chibi Moon becomes a full-fledged Sailor Guardian in the future. Helios escorts the others back to the surface before returning to Elysion, assuring Chibiusa that they will meet again. Mamoru wonders if the warm feeling in his chest is caused by the Golden Crystal, but Usagi assures that it's a star shining in his heart.

Voice cast

Additional voice cast includes:

Production

Development
On January 25, 2017, it was announced on the official Sailor Moon 25th anniversary website that the Sailor Moon Crystal anime would continue. Later, on June 30 of the same year, it was revealed that the fourth season based on Dream arc of the manga was to be produced as a two-part theatrical anime film project. Additionally, Chiaki Kon, who was a series director for the third season of the anime, returned as a main director for the films.

On June 30, 2018, it was announced that the film's production had begun, and Kazuko Tadano, who handled the character designs for the first two seasons of the 1990s Sailor Moon anime series and Sailor Moon R: The Movie, was chosen as a character designer for the film.

Casting
Most of the main voice actors from Sailor Moon Crystal had returned for the two-part film, but, for unknown reasons, Taishi Murata took over Yohei Oobayashi's role as Artemis. In April 2020, it was announced that Yoshitsugu Matsuoka will voice Pegasus/Helios for the film. In August 2020, it was announced that Shouta Aoi, Satoshi Hino, and Toshiyuki Toyonaga were to voice the Amazon Trio: Fish Eye, Tiger's Eye, and Hawk's Eye. The following week, Reina Ueda, Sumire Morohoshi, Yūko Hara, and Rie Takahashi were cast as the Amazoness Quartet: CereCere, PallaPalla, JunJun, and VesVes. In September 2020, it was announced that the Japanese comedian, fashion designer and actress Naomi Watanabe was cast as Zirconia. The following month, Japanese model and actress Nanao was cast as Queen Nehelenia.

Music

Yasuharu Takanashi returned to compose the music for the two-part film. The theme song for the two-part film is titled , performed by Momoiro Clover Z with Sailor5Guardians. The song's lyrics were written by Naoko Takeuchi (under the name of "Sumire Shirobara"), composed by Akiko Kosaka, and arranged by Gesshoku Kaigi. The eleven-track character song collection album, titled Pretty Guardian Sailor Moon Eternal The Movie Character Song Collection: Eternal Collection, was released on February 10, 2021, and the eleventh track, titled "Moon Effect", performed by the voice actresses for all ten Sailor Guardians, is used as an insert song for the second film.

Release

Japanese release
The first film was slated to release in Japanese theaters on September 11, 2020, but was postponed and released four months later on January 8, 2021, due to COVID-19 pandemic. The second film was released on February 11, 2021.

The Japanese Blu-ray and DVD were released on June 30, 2021.

International release
In late April 2021, it was announced that Netflix acquired the streaming rights for the two-part film, and it premiered worldwide on June 3, 2021. In early May 2021, it was announced that the English dub cast from both Sailor Moon Crystal and the redub of the 1990s anime reprised their roles, with the exception of Chris Niosi as he did not reprise his role as Helios. The role was assumed by Brian Beacock who previously voiced Ail, an original character in the redub of Sailor Moon R.

Reception
The first film debuted ninth place out of top ten from weekend box office, and also ranked sixth in Filmarks' first-day satisfaction ranking with a score of 3.46 out of 5 based on 242 reviews. On review aggregator Rotten Tomatoes, the two-part film holds a  rating based on  reviews.

Victoria Johnson of Polygon gave a positive review, and wrote "At its heart, Pretty Guardian Sailor Moon Eternal The Movie is about overcoming evil with the power of love and friendship. And there's nothing more Sailor Moon than that". Lynzee Loveridge of Anime News Network gave a B approval rating and wrote "Pretty Guardian Sailor Moon Eternal is a solid entry in the Sailor Moon canon that had the pieces to be something even better. You can put your worries aside as it routinely looks excellent and, occasionally, fantastic". Rosie Knight from IGN labeled the two films as a "good adventure that boasts stunning animation, vibrant storytelling, and the return of our favorite magical girl Sailor Scouts in a dynamic double bill that will inspire and entertain." Michael Mammano from Den of Geek stated that Eternal is "an enthralling adaptation of one of the manga's best arcs."

Sequel
A sequel was hinted at the end of the second film during its Japanese theatrical release, with an English teaser-line, "To be continued..." On April 28, 2022 during the Sailor Moon 30th anniversary livestream, the sequel covering the Stars arc of the manga, was announced as a two-part anime film, titled . Both films will be released in Japan on June 9 and 30, 2023, respectively.

Notes

References

External links
  
 
 
 

2020s animated superhero films
2021 anime films
Anime postponed due to the COVID-19 pandemic
Circus films
Films about dreams
Films directed by Chiaki Kon
Films postponed due to the COVID-19 pandemic
Films scored by Yasuharu Takanashi
Japanese sequel films
Japanese-language Netflix original films
Eternal

ja:美少女戦士セーラームーンCrystal#劇場版 美少女戦士セーラームーンEternal